This is a list of the mayors of the City of Greater Geelong, a local government area, and the second largest city in Victoria, Australia. Before amalgamation in 1993 the central area of Geelong was covered by the City of Geelong, with the surrounding suburbs falling into the Shire of Barrabool, Shire of Bannockburn, Rural City of Bellarine, Shire of Corio, City of Geelong West, City of Newtown, and City of South Barwon.

Town of Geelong (1849–1910)

City of Geelong (1910–1993)

Commissioners (1993–1995)

City of Greater Geelong (since 1993)

Administrators (2016–2017)

See also
 City of Greater Geelong
 Geelong, Victoria
 2012 Geelong mayoral election
 2013 Geelong mayoral election

References

Geelong

Mayors Geelong